Sprengel's deformity (also known as high scapula or congenital high scapula) is a rare congenital skeletal abnormality where a person has one shoulder blade that sits higher on the back than the other. The deformity is due to a failure in early fetal development where the shoulder fails to descend properly from the neck to its final position. Majority of the cases are sporadic with very few having autosomal dominant inheritance.

The deformity is associated  with the following conditions:-

 Klippel–Feil syndrome (most common)
 congenital scoliosis, 
 hemivertebrae, 
 cervical ribs, ⁣
 fused ribs, 
 omovertebral connections which are fibrous, cartilaginous or bony connection between the superomedial angle of scapula with the spinous process, lamina or transverse process of cervical spine
 spina bifida,
 cleft palate.

The left shoulder is more commonly affected, but it can occur bilaterally as well.

About 75% of all observed cases are girls. Treatment includes surgery in early childhood and physical therapy. Surgical treatment in adulthood is complicated by the risk of nerve damage when removing the omovertebral bone and when stretching the muscle tissue during relocation of the shoulder.

Presentation

The scapula is small and rotated so that its inferior edge points toward the spine. Sometimes a bony connection is present between the elevated scapula and one of the cervical vertebrae, usually C5 or C6. This connection is known as an omovertebral bone.

There is a high correlation between Sprengel's deformity and Klippel–Feil syndrome.

Diagnosis

Diagnosis is clinical and can be confirmed by instrumental diagnostics like conventional radiography and CT scan. It may be indicated to perform a genetic analysis, as the deformity may occur under other conditions (see Klippel–Feil syndrome).

Eponym
It is named for German surgeon Otto Sprengel, who described it in 1891.

References

External links 

Congenital disorders of musculoskeletal system